Milford is a city in Seward County, Nebraska, United States. It is part of the Lincoln, Nebraska Metropolitan Statistical Area. The population was 2,090 at the 2010 census.

History
Milford was platted in 1866. It took its name from a mill at a ford on the Blue River.

Geography
Milford is located at  (40.772010, -97.052311).

Demographics

2010 census
As of the census of 2010, there were 2,090 people, 770 households, and 494 families living in the city. The racial makeup of the city was 97.4% White, 0.3% African American, 0.4% Native American, 0.2% Asian, 0.7% from other races, and 1.0% from two or more races. Hispanic or Latino of any race were 1.6% of the population.

There were 770 households, of which 30.6% had children under the age of 18 living with them, 55.6% were married couples living together, 4.8% had a female householder with no husband present, 3.8% had a male householder with no wife present, and 35.8% were non-families. 29.0% of all households were made up of individuals, and 13.5% had someone living alone who was 65 years of age or older. The average household size was 2.39 and the average family size was 2.97.

The median age in the city was 31.7 years. 22.2% of residents were under the age of 18; 21.1% were between the ages of 18 and 24; 20% were from 25 to 44; 21.5% were from 45 to 64; and 15.4% were 65 years of age or older. The gender makeup of the city was 55.8% male and 44.2% female.

2000 census
As of the census of 2000, there were 2,070 people, 722 households, and 464 families living in the city. The population density was 2,901.9 people per square mile (1,125.7/km2). There were 770 housing units at an average density of 1,079.5 per square mile (418.7/km2). The racial makeup of the city was 97.83% White, 0.24% African American, 0.29% Native American, 0.05% Asian, 0.05% Pacific Islander, 0.68% from other races, and 0.87% from two or more races. Hispanic or Latino of any race were 1.50% of the population.

There were 722 households, out of which 30.2% had children under the age of 18 living with them, 56.1% were married couples living together, 5.7% had a female householder with no husband present, and 35.7% were non-families. 26.7% of all households were made up of individuals, and 10.9% had someone living alone who was 65 years of age or older. The average household size was 2.44 and the average family size was 2.99.

In the city, the population was spread out, with 21.7% under the age of 18, 24.9% from 18 to 24, 21.9% from 25 to 44, 16.5% from 45 to 64, and 15.0% who were 65 years of age or older. The median age was 28 years. For every 100 females, there were 132.1 males. For every 100 females age 18 and over, there were 140.5 males.

As of 2000 the median income for a household in the city was $37,039, and the median income for a family was $51,012. Males had a median income of $30,170 compared to $22,026 for females. The per capita income for the city was $16,217. About 4.6% of families and 10.6% of the population were below the poverty line, including 6.7% of those under age 18 and 11.2% of those age 65 or over.

Government
Milford uses a city council consisting of six members plus the mayor. As of March 2020, the current mayor of Milford is James Stone.

Education
Milford is the location of a campus of Southeast Community College.  Originally established in Milford in 1941 as the Nebraska State Trade School, it became part of the new Southeast Technical Community College system in 1973.  As of 2016, about 750 students were enrolled on the campus.

Notable people
 Harry Culver, Hollywood real estate developer, founder of Culver City, California
 Victor Mills, chemical engineer
 Bill Rumler, baseball player

City Flag 

Currently, Milford is one of only 11 cities in Nebraska to have an official flag. This flag was adopted on March 5, 2019, but had been worked on since July 2018. It was designed as an Eagle Scout Service Project for the Boy Scouts of America, and was adopted at a city council meeting.

References

Cities in Nebraska
Cities in Seward County, Nebraska
Lincoln, Nebraska metropolitan area